The Order of the Shield and Spears (Ekitiibwa ky'Amafumu n'Engabo) is the Kingdom of Buganda's highest honour. It was established by Daudi Cwa II of Buganda, Kabaka of the Buganda, for the purpose of recognizing excellent service to the kingdom. It is awarded annually by the Kabaka of Buganda.

History 
The Order of the Shields and Spears was established on 8 August 1927 by Daudi Cwa II of Buganda, Kabaka of the Buganda, for the purpose of recognizing excellent service to the kingdom. The order's medals was created on 26 May 1937.

It is awarded to Bugandan subjects and foreign nationals.

Classes 
The order consists of the following classes of merit:

 Commander – CSS
 Officer or Omutongole – OSS
 Member or Omukungu – MSS

Notable recipients 
 Sir Apolo Kagwa, KCMG MBE
 Serwano Kulubya 
 Martin Luther Nsibirwa
 Joseph Mulwanyamuli Ssemwogerere
 Godfrey Kaaya Kavuma
 Prince Daniel Steven Kimbugwe
 John Ssebaana Kizito
 Jen Sebiri Mulwana 
 Rosalia Kyoteka
 Yvonne Namaganda
 Cardinal Emmanuel Nsubuga
 Prince Badru Mbuga Kakungulu
 Bishop Dustan Nsubuga 
 Rev. Polycarp Kakooza
 Joyce Mpanga
 Christopher Sebadduka
 George Kakoma
 Major Joash Katende
 Capt. George Maalo
 Michael B. Nsimbi
 Joseph Musoke
 Balaki Kirya
 Capt. Ronald Owen 
 Major Richard Carr-Gomm
 Martin Flegg

See also
 Kingdom of Buganda
 Kabaka of Buganda
 Daudi Cwa II of Buganda

References

External links
 Buddo Girl Namaganda Receives Buganda's Highest Honour

Buganda